Biathlon at the 2011 European Youth Winter Olympic Festival was held from 13 to 18 February 2011. It was held at the Biathlon Venue at Jablonec nad Nisou, Czech Republic.

Results

Medal table

Men's events

Women's events

Mixed events

References 

Biathlon
2011 in biathlon
Biathlon at the Youth Olympics
2011